Kaaleste is a surname. Notable people with the surname include:

Anna Kaaleste (1930–2014), Soviet cross-country skier
Mikhail Kaaleste (1931–2018), Estonian sprint canoeist

Estonian-language surnames